The boys' singles tournament of the 2017 Asian Junior Badminton Championships was held from July 26 to 30. The defending champions of the last edition was Sun Feixiang from China. Leong Jun Hao of Malaysia emerged as the champion after beating Bai Yupeng of China in the final with the score 21-6, 20-22, 21-17.

Men's singles

Seeds

  Lakshya Sen (fourth round)
  Lee Chia-hao (fourth round)
  Kunlavut Vitidsarn (semifinals)
  Chen Chi-ting (semifinals)
  Dmitriy Panarin (second round)
  Leong Jun Hao (champion)
  Pacharaapol Nipornram (fourth round)
  Sim Fong Hau (fourth round)
  Chan Yin Chak (second round)
  Kim Moon-jun (third round)
  Saran Jamsri (third round)
  Chen Shiau-cheng (fourth round)
  Woo Seung-hoon (third round)
  Ruttanapak Oupthong (fourth round)
  Kartikey Gulshan Kumar (fourth round)
  Ikhsan Rumbay (quarterfinals)

Draw

Finals

Top half

Section 1

Section 2

Section 3

Section 4

Bottom half

Section 5

Section 6

Section 7

Section 8

References

External links 
Main Draw

2017 Badminton Asia Junior Championships